İncə or Incha or Indzha may refer to:
İncə, Goychay, Azerbaijan
İncə, Shaki, Azerbaijan
Hinqar, Azerbaijan
Incheh (disambiguation), Iran